Javidhan was an Iranian landlord and leader of one of the two Khurramite movements in Azerbaijan, with his headquarters being in Badhdh. The leader of the other Khurramite movement was a certain Abu Imran, who often clashed with Javidhans forces. During one of the clashes, in probably the early 810s, Abu Imran was defeated and killed, whilst Javidhan was mortally wounded, dying three days later. Javidhan was succeeded by his apprentice Babak Khorramdin, who also married Javidhan's widow. Javidhan was survived by a son, who was most likely too young to succeed him.

References

Sources

 
 
 
 
 

 
 

8th-century births
810s deaths
Iranian Zoroastrians
8th-century Iranian people
9th-century Iranian people
Khurramites
Azerbaijan under the Abbasid Caliphate